The Chivasso–Alessandria railway is a railway line in Piedmont, Italy.

History 
The section from Valenza to Alessandria was opened on 5 June 1854 as part of the railway from Alessandria to Novara and Arona. The section from Casale Monferrato to Valenza was opened on 22 March 1857 as part of the railway from Vercelli to Valenza. The section from Chivasso to Casale came into operation on 30 April 1887.

See also 
 List of railway lines in Italy

References

Footnotes

Sources
 
 
 

Railway lines in Piedmont
Railway lines opened in 1887